Čakajovce is a village and municipality in the Nitra District in western central Slovakia, in the Nitra Region.

History
In historical records the village was first mentioned in 1251.

Geography
The village lies at an altitude of 146 metres and covers an area of 5.77 km². It has a population of about 1070 people.

Ethnicity
The village is approximately 98% Slovak.

Facilities
The village has a public library and football pitch. Also has two chambers and the Roman Catholic Church of St. Catherine

See also
 List of municipalities and towns in Slovakia

References

Genealogical resources

The records for genealogical research are available at the state archive "Statny Archiv in Nitra, Slovakia"

 Roman Catholic church records (births/marriages/deaths): 1747-1899 (parish B)

External links
http://www.statistics.sk/mosmis/eng/run.html
 http://www.cakajovce.sk
Surnames of living people in Cakajovce

Villages and municipalities in Nitra District